Greene County–Lewis A. Jackson Regional Airport  is a public use airport located in Xenia, a city in Greene County, Ohio, United States. It is 10 nautical miles (19 km) east of the central business district of the city of Dayton. 

The airport is owned by the Greene County Regional Airport Authority. It underwent a significant expansion in 2005, adding runway and taxi length as well as service buildings and roads. The airport underwent significant improvements again in 2016, including runway resurfacing,  a new run-up apron for runway 25, new 75,000 sq/ft ramp, and new corporate box hangars. In 2018, the runway length was increased from 4,500 to 5,004 feet. In 2020, the Greene County Career Center opened their new A&P training facility/hangar on the airport.

Facilities and aircraft 
It has one runway designated 7/25 with a 5,004 by 75 ft (1,525 x 23 m) asphalt pavement.

For the 12-month period ending September 9, 2021, the airport had 50,800 aircraft operations, an average of 139 per day, all of which were general aviation. At that time there were 85 aircraft based at this airport:
92% single-engine and 8% multi-engine.

References

External links 
 

Dr. Jackson training other airmen
Dr. Lewis A Jackson's Folding plane 1956
Dr. Lewis A. Jackson's Folding plane on "Brush Row Road" 1956
Dr. Lewis A. Jackson's Folding plane in his Wilberforce Ohio driveway

Airports in Ohio
Buildings and structures in Greene County, Ohio
Transportation in Greene County, Ohio
Xenia, Ohio